John Harington Gubbins  (24 January 1852 – 23 February 1929) was a British linguist, consular official and diplomat. He was the father of Sir Colin McVean Gubbins.

Education
Gubbins attended Harrow School and would have gone on to Cambridge University, had family finances allowed.

Career

Gubbins was appointed a student interpreter in the British Japan Consular Service in 1871. He was English Secretary to the Conference at Tokyo for the Revision of the Treaties, after Ernest Satow left Japan in 1883. On 1 June 1889, he was appointed Japanese Secretary in Tokyo. 

He was employed in London at the Foreign Office from February to July 1894 in the Aoki-Kimberley negotiations which resulted in the Anglo-Japanese Treaty of Commerce and Navigation (16 July 1894). He was appointed CMG in the 1898 Birthday Honours.

He was, especially in retirement, a close friend of Satow's. He was elected the first President of the newly founded Royal Asiatic Society Korea Branch in 1900.

Despite having no university degree, Gubbins was awarded an honorary master's degree from Balliol College and was made Lecturer in Japanese language at Oxford University (1909–12). Lack of pupils led to his position being terminated.

Family
Gubbins frequently visited Colin Alexander McVean's residence at Yamato Yashiki, Tokyo around the 1870s, and met his daughter Helen. After McVean returned to Scotland and settled down at the Isle of Mull, Gubbins visited the McVean family and met Helen again. 41 years Gubbins and 24 years Helen fell in love and married in 1894, then lived in Japan. They had four children, who were grown up at McVean's residence at the Isle of Mull. The second son was Colin McVean Gubbins, who became chief of the Special Operations Executive later.

See also
Joseph Henry Longford

References
 Ian Nish, "John Harrington Gubbins, 1852-1929," chap. 8 in Britain and Japan: Biographical Portraits, vol. 2, edited by Ian Nish (Japan Library, 1997).
 Private correspondence from J.H. Gubbins to Sir Ernest Satow, 1908–27, UK Public Record Office (PRO 30/33 11/8, 11/9, and 11/10).

1852 births
1929 deaths
British expatriates in Japan
Companions of the Order of St Michael and St George
People educated at Harrow School